Qualitative economics is the representation and analysis of information about the direction of change (+, -, or 0) in some economic variable(s) as related to change of some other economic variable(s).  For the non-zero case, what makes the change  qualitative is that its direction but not its magnitude is specified.

Typical exercises of qualitative economics include comparative-static changes studied in microeconomics or macroeconomics and comparative equilibrium-growth states in a macroeconomic growth model.  A simple example illustrating qualitative change is from macroeconomics.  Let:
GDP = nominal gross domestic product, a measure of national income
 M = money supply
T = total taxes.
Monetary theory hypothesizes a positive relationship between GDP the dependent variable and M the independent variable. Equivalent ways to represent such a qualitative relationship between them are as a signed functional relationship and as a signed derivative: 

  or 
where the '+' indexes a positive relationship of GDP to M, that is, as M increases, GDP increases as a result.

Another model of GDP hypothesizes that GDP has a negative relationship to T. This   can be represented similarly to the above, with a theoretically appropriate sign change as indicated:

   or 
That is, as T increases, GDP decreases as a result.
A combined model uses both M and T as independent variables.  The hypothesized relationships can be equivalently represented as signed functional relationships and signed partial derivatives (suitable for more than one independent variable):  

 or   

Qualitative hypotheses occur in earliest history of formal economics but only as to formal economic models from the late 1930s with Hicks's model of general equilibrium in a competitive economy. A classic exposition of qualitative economics is Samuelson, 1947. There Samuelson identifies qualitative restrictions and the hypotheses of maximization and stability of equilibrium as the three fundamental sources of meaningful theorems — hypotheses about empirical data that could conceivably be refuted by empirical data.

Notes

References
 J. R. Hicks, 1939. Value and Capital. Oxford.
 Kelvin Lancaster, 1962. "The Scope of Qualitative Economics," Review of Economic Studies, 29(2),  pp. 99-123.
W.M. Gorman, 1964. "More Scope for Qualitative Economics," Review of Economic Studies, 31(1)  pp. 65-68.  
 James Quirk, 1987. "qualitative economics," The New Palgrave: A Dictionary of Economics, v. 4, pp. 1-3.
 _ and Richard Ruppert, 1965. "Qualitative Economics and the Stability of Equilibrium," Review of Economic Studies, 32(4), pp. 311-326.
 Paul A. Samuelson, 1947. Foundations of Economic Analysis, Harvard University Press.  

Comparative statics
Mathematical and quantitative methods (economics)